Giovanni Serodine (1600 – December 21, 1630) was a Swiss-Italian painter of the early Baroque period.

Born to a family of stuccoists in Ascona in Canton Ticino (in present-day Switzerland), he gravitated while in Rome and there developed an idiosyncratic expression of Carravaggist style. His style has the loose brushstroke and luminosity of some of the northern Caravaggisti, such as Lys, Strozzi, and Fetti, who were active in Venice; however, some of Serodine's canvases show a provincial eccentricity, for example Coronation of the Virgin in Ascona. Baglione found in his art a great vivacity, although he noted Serodine appears to have made few friends and patrons in Rome. In his short mature career, he produced a handful of intensely emotional tenebrist canvases such as a Jesus among the Masters (Louvre); Jesus and the Tribute money (National Gallery of Scotland); Saint Lawrence distributing alms (painted for San Lorenzo fuori le Mura, now Convent of Valvisciolo in Sermoneta); Decapitation of Saint John the Baptist (San Lorenzo fuori le Mura); Saint Michael (originally San Pietro in Montorio) and Transfiguration of Christ (whereabouts unknown); Road to Emmaus and Sons of Zebedee (Ascona); Portrait of his father (Lugano); and Portrait of a Philosopher (Rancate).

References

A Masterpiece by Giovanni Serodine, Giuseppe Fiocco. The Burlington Magazine (1929) pp 190–191,195
A Giovanni Serodine Exhibition. A. Scharf.The Burlington Magazine (1950). pp 352–355.

External links

 Artcyclopedia entry

1600 births
1630 deaths
People from Ascona
17th-century Italian painters
Italian male painters
Italian Baroque painters
Caravaggisti
17th-century Swiss painters
Swiss male painters